Paracymboides is a genus of Asian dwarf spiders that was first described by A. V. Tanasevitch in 2011.

Species
 it contains two species:
Paracymboides aduncus Tanasevitch, 2011 – India
Paracymboides tibialis Tanasevitch, 2011 (type) – India

See also
 List of Linyphiidae species (I–P)

References

Araneomorphae genera
Linyphiidae
Spiders of the Indian subcontinent